The 2013–14 season was the 134th season of competitive football by Rangers.

Overview
Rangers played a total of 48 competitive matches during the 2013–14 season.

The club began the season still under the year-long transfer embargo, meaning that several players signed during the summer could not be registered under the end of the window, although the club sought clarification on this after Heart of Midlothian received what appeared to be a lesser punishment for going into administration. Despite this the club confirmed several players on pre-contract agreements, many of which on lucrative contracts. Due to rules permitting trialists to play as amateurs in the league and Challenge Cup, several footballers made their Rangers debut during the month of August. The Scottish League One campaign began at Ibrox Stadium with a 4–1 win over Brechin City and the side embarked upon a run of fifteen straight wins in the league, claiming their twentieth successive win in all competitions by beating Ayr United on 7 December. It was not until Boxing day that season that the club dropped a point in the league by drawing 1–1 at home to Stranraer, who scored a ninety-fourth-minute equaliser. The side claimed the League One title on 12 March at Ibrox Stadium by defeating Airdrieonians 3–0, thanks to a Lee McCulloch hat-trick, having won 26 of their 28 league matches without suffering defeat. Indeed, the side was to go through the rest of the campaign unbeaten, finishing the season with a draw away to Dunfermline Athletic, only their third in the league that season and matching a 115-year-old record from the Rangers side of 1898–99 season. Away from the league, the side did not fare well suffering defeat in the League Cup defeat by Forfar Athletic at the beginning of the season, a 2016 Challenge Cup final loss to Raith Rovers and, despite a lively, committed performance, a Scottish Cup semi-final defeat by Dundee United.

Off the field issues continued to overshadow the team, although initially things seemed to have pacified when former manager Walter Smith was appointed as chairman of the Plc board in May, however, he lasted less than two months before resigning. Smith's departure coincided with the return of former Chief executive Charles Green in a consultant capacity. Green became embroiled in a row with Rangers manager Ally McCoist after her suggested that McCoist had to win a cup as well as League One that season to save his job. Ultimately, Green's influence was seen to be more damaging than positive and he agreed to resign his position and sell his remaining shares in the club to Sandy Easdale. A second former board member, Imran Ahmad, also sold his remaining shares in the club as it was reported he was preparing to sue the club for £3.4m in unpaid bonus money. Meanwhile, a group of Rangers shareholders, led by former director Paul Murray, requisitioned an EGM to vote on the removal of Plc board directors including chief executive Craig Mather. This was partly the result of shareholders being concerned over Mather's £500,000 annual salary. The Rangers board opening negotiations with the requisitioners in late August to delay the EGM and combine it with AGM business and after prolonged and fictitious meetings the requisitioners withdrew the request for an EGM. Nevertheless, the requisitioners were not to be deterred and wrote to Rangers with a proposal to have four new directors appointed at the AGM, however the board failed to put this motion on the agenda forcing the requisitioners to seek an interim interdict in order for a new agenda to be sent out thus delaying the AGM.

The club's financial results were announced at the start of October with an operating loss of £14m in the thirteen months to June 2013, with the revelation that the club spends more on non-playing staff than on the squad. This led to discussions between Mather and former Rangers director Dave King over the latter's potential investment in the club and Rangers manager, Ally McCoist agreeing to take a substantial pay-cut. Mather's meeting with King caused unease in the Rangers boardroom and was thought to be the reason behind his removal as chief executive on 16 October leaving only two directors on the Plc board. The lack of corporate governance was criticised by Rangers nominated adviser and led to the appointment of David Somers as non-executive director and acting chairman a few weeks later. On the same day as Somers' appointment, the date for the AGM was set for 19 December. This instigated an arms race between warring factions for control of Rangers. In the five weeks prior to the AGM, the board proceeded to appoint Norman Crighton as non-executive director, Graham Wallace as the new chief executive and confirmed Somers as permanent chairman, much to the bemusement of the requisitioners who questioned the appointments so close to the AGM. Around this time, going perhaps unnoticed, was the news that Police Scotland was investigating whether former owner Craig Whyte was still involved at Rangers as well as the acquisition and management of the club. Perhaps the most important machinations involved moves by the board to secure support from other shareholders and their voting rights, with the largest single shareholder Laxey Partners indicating its  support for the current board at the AGM. A week before the AGM it was clear that the board had amassed a sizeable proportion of voting rights, which ultimately, saw them re-elected and the requisitioners defeated.

Upon his re-election, Wallace indicated his intention to undertake a three-month review of the club's business operations and it was revealed this included cuts to the first-team wage budget. The Rangers manager signed off on a wage reduction on 11 January, the same day as the club hired Philip Nash as a financial consultant to assist with the business review. Following this the club unsuccessfully asked the first-team squad to take pay cuts of around 15% until summer 2015 and as greater scrutiny was focused on the club's finances, Rangers financial director Brian Stockbridge resigned on 24 January. Indeed, in early February Wallace was forced to deny claims that the club was on the brink of a second insolvency event, however, two-weeks later Rangers borrowed £1.5m from shareholders Sandy Easdale and Laxey Partners for working capital. The loan agreement was widely criticised, as Laxey Partners stood to make £150,000 in either interest or shares by the time it was repaid and also the Albion Car Park and Edmiston House were being used as security. Despite this, prior to his court case, former director Imran Ahmad had failed to ring-fence cash at the club ahead of his now £500,000 lawsuit.

Nevertheless, concerns over the club's money issues lingered and led Dave King to suggest fans withhold season ticket money until they receive assurances from the board. This caused a war of words between King and the board with Wallace criticising the boycott call suggesting it could be damaging to the club however, a coalition of Rangers fans groups known as the Union of Fans, supported King's stance on withholding season ticket money. King and the supporters groups were planning to meet in order to formalise legal structures for trusts into which fans could put future season ticket money. This caused the Rangers board to demand that King attend a board meeting where he would explain his recent comments and the following day the club revealed it was considering an alternative loan offer on better terms than Laxey Partners from businessman George Letham. King agreed to this meeting and during a spell in Scotland in mid March, he met with several institutional investors including Laxey Partners, as well as the Union of Fans and the Plc board. The outcome from the Union of Fans meeting was an agreement for the pooling of season ticket renewal money in a trust fund which would only be released to the club when the group was granted security over Ibrox Stadium and Rangers Training Centre, however, upon meeting with the board King was informed the club had no intention of using Ibrox or Murray Park for securities on any borrowing. Upon the conclusion of the board meeting, there was an act of good faith on King's part, in which he agreed to a four-week grace period to allow the club to complete and publish a business review of the company, after which King would decide upon continuing with any further action. Whilst agreeing to the grace period, the Union of Fans did decide to press ahead with plans to create a season ticket trust fund. Towards the end of March, the club accepted the loan offer from Letham on the same day as King pledged to invest up to £50m of his own money in the club. However, the reality of Rangers financial predicament was laid bare just two days later by the publishing of the interim accounts, which reported losses of £3.5m in the six months to 31 December and showed cash reserves had fallen from £21.2m to £3.5m.

Despite the good faith shown by King, the Rangers board proceeded with the season ticket renewal campaign at the beginning of April, before the business review was concluded. This soured the relationship between the Rangers board and King and ended negotiations, with the latter accusing the club of deliberately delaying the publishing of the review until after the renewal period and the Union of Fans remained aligned with King. Indeed, the fans group demanded the board reveal details of the executive bonus entitlements, which it refused to do. Around the same time, Rangers announced a three-year agreement with online casino company 32Red to be the club's new shirt sponsor. On the eve of the business review's publication it was reported that Rangers second highest appearance maker Sandy Jardine had died aged just 65 after a long battle with throat cancer. There was a high degree of anticipation surrounding the review with journalists noting an eight-day delay and the fans hopes for detail and clarity regarding the boards future plans while Rangers director Sandy Easdale acknowledged that the club financial situation was fragile. Upon its publication the review stated the club needed to raise £30m by 2017, including a new share issue, for it to compete in the top league and the board aimed to make the business sustainable by season 2015/16 but required savings to be made including staff redundancies. Issues regarding financial mismanagement by the board came to light from the review including £2m which was spent on stadium Wi-Fi, LED displays and jumbo screens that were deemed "non-essential" and that players were signed during the summer which executives should have known the club could not afford.

Following on from the publication of the business review, Police Scotland investigated a complaint from a Rangers shareholder against Wallace regarding alleged misleading statements that he made about the club's finances at December's AGM. This led to calls from the Union of Fans for Wallace to be suspended pending the outcome of the investigation while Dave King demanded the police probe be extended to include all of the Rangers board. Despite the admissions arising from the business review, Imran Ahmad was again unsuccessful in an attempt to have money frozen in the club's accounts pending the outcome of his litigation against the club, however, there was indications a third attempt might be successful as King and former club captain Richard Gough set up the Ibrox 1972 Fund for fans to pay season ticket money into. This move appeared to make the board more receptive to granting the Union of Fans a legally-binding undertaking protecting Ibrox Stadium and the training centre, however, this proposal was again rejected by the board a few days later. The club admitted that season ticket renewals had been slow, but were reluctant to released details despite fan protests against the board and demands from fans group to reveal how many season tickets have been sold. Further to this, former Rangers defender and youth coach John Brown delivered a 7,000 signature petition calling for the board to protect the club's property assets. The beginning of May, saw Sandy Easdale increase his shareholding to 4.61%, while retaining proxy over a further 22.10%, leaving him as the second most prominent shareholder at the club after Laxey Partners by the summer of 2014. Despite the deputes with fans, withholding of season ticket money and precarious financial position, Wallace still went on to state he believed the club to be in a "good place".

Players

Squad information

Transfers

In

Total expenditure: £0m

Out

Total income: £0m

New Contracts

Squad statistics

Goal scorers

Disciplinary record

Awards

Club

Board of directors

Coaching staff

Other staff

Friendlies and pre-season
Rangers preceded their 2013-14 campaign with a tour of the north of Scotland, followed by a training camp in Germany. The club played two friendlies against continental opposition before returning to the United Kingdom to play English side Sheffield Wednesday at Hillsborough Stadium. Rangers concluded their pre-season campaign with a 1-1 draw against Newcastle United at Ibrox Stadium.

Competitions
As a Scottish League One club, Rangers entered the Scottish Cup in the Third Round and entered both the Scottish Challenge Cup and Scottish League Cup in the First Round. They also competed in 36 league matches in the new Scottish League One.

Scottish League One

Standings

Results by round

Scottish League One

Challenge Cup

League Cup

Scottish Cup

References 

2013-14
Scottish football clubs 2013–14 season